Skenderaj ( or Skënderaji) or Srbica is a town and municipality located in the Mitrovica District of Kosovo. According to the 2011 census, the town of Skënderaj has 9,372 inhabitants, while the municipality has 50,858 inhabitants.

It is the largest city in the Drenica geographical region of Kosovo. It is mainly populated by ethnic Albanians. It is claimed to be the poorest city in Kosovo. It is the place where the Kosovo War began in 1998, and to which the most damage was done.

Geography
The settlement is by the Klina river, in the Klina field (Klinsko polje). It is the main settlement of the Drenica region. The Klina river belongs to the Metohija region, while the settlement morphologically and hydrologically gravitates towards the Kosovo region.

History

Research was conducted in about 35 private parcels in the Dardania neighborhood of Runik. Starcevo and Vinca pottery fragments dating to 6500-3500 BC have been found at the site. A significant find is a baked-clay ocarina  in length, known as the Runik Ocarina, the oldest musical instrument found in Kosovo to date.

The municipality cadastral area includes several settlements that existed during the Middle Ages, among which some exist still today, such as Liqinë, Polac, Banjë, and others. There are ruins of a church dating to the 14th century in southern Leqinë. The Church of St. Nicholas was built in 1436, in Banjë, as the endowment of Serbian magnate Rodop. The Devič monastery was built in Llausha near Skënderaj in the 15th century, dedicated to the local monk, St. Joanikije (d. 1430). The Church of St. John was built in the 16th century on the ruins of a 14th-century church, in Leqinë; the church is surrounded by an old and large Serbian graveyard with tombs dating to the 17th–19th centuries. A 16th-century church and cemetery is located in Runik.

In the early 20th century Albanian resistance began with the Kachak movement led by Azem Bejta and his wife Shote Galica, who fought against Bulgarian, Austro-Hungarian and Yugoslav forces. At the end of World War II in 1944, the leader of the Drenica Brigade Shaban Polluzha refused to lead his 12,000 men north and join the Partisans in order to pursue the retreating Germans, because Serbian Chetnik groups were attacking the Albanian population in Kosovo.

Economy
Skënderaj has historically been the poorest municipality in Kosovo, with little investment having been made since the time of the former Yugoslavia. It suffers from low economic activity and continuous high unemployment. Agriculture is the major local industry but the municipality has not fully developed existing arable land. Today, the local economy consists of small enterprises such as family-run shops and restaurants while two privatized factories, a brick and a flour mill, employ a few hundred people. The other major sector of employment is the municipality's civil service.

Sport
Skënderaj is home of the Kosovar Superliga football club KF Drenica, which plays their home games in the Bajram Aliu Stadium. Skënderaj is also home of the Kosovar Superliga volleyball club KV Skenderaj women's and KV Drenica men's.

Cultural heritage
Devič, Serbian Orthodox abbey

Demographics

According to the last official census done in 2011, the municipality of Skenderaj has 50,858 inhabitants.

Ethnic groups
The ethnic composition of the municipality:

Notable people
 Halil Xani, poet and writer, born in Skenderaj
 Adem Jashari, Kosovo Liberation Army leader, born in Prekaz
 Hashim Thaçi, President of Kosovo (2016–present)
 Hamëz Jashari, co-founder of KLA and brother of Adem Jashari
 Hasan Prishtina, political leader of Albanian National Movement
 Sylejman Selimi, comrade of Jashari
 Shote Galica, Kachak leader
 Përparim Hetemaj, footballer
 Mehmet Hetemaj, footballer
 Ahmet Delia, activist of League of Prizren

See also
Municipalities of Kosovo
Cities and towns in Kosovo
Populated places in Kosovo

References and Notes

Sources

External links

 Municipality of Skenderaj
 OSCE Profile of Skenderaj
 SOK Kosovo and its population

 
Cities in Kosovo
Municipalities of Kosovo
Populated places in the District of Mitrovica
Drenica